Black Rock School District was a school district headquartered in Black Rock, Arkansas. Black Rock Elementary School and Black Rock High School were its schools.

It served the majority of Black Rock.

On July 1, 2006, it merged with the Walnut Ridge School District to form the Lawrence County School District.

References

External links
 

School districts disestablished in 2006
2006 disestablishments in Arkansas
Defunct school districts in Arkansas
Education in Lawrence County, Arkansas